Thomas Shute House is a property in Franklin, Tennessee, United States, that was listed on the National Register of Historic Places in 1988. The property has also been known as Creekside. It dates from at c.1845. The property was covered in a 1988 study of Williamson County historical resources. It is one of about thirty "significant brick and frame residences" surviving in Williamson County that were built during 1830 to 1860 and "were the center of large plantations " and display "some of the finest construction of the ante-bellum era." It faces on the Franklin and Columbia Pike that ran south from Brentwood to Franklin to Columbia.

See also
Mooreland, also on the pike north of Franklin and NRHP-listed
James Johnston House, also on the pike north of Franklin and NRHP-listed
Aspen Grove, also on the pike north of Franklin and a Williamson County historic resource
Mountview, also on the pike north of Franklin and a Williamson County historic resource
Alpheus Truett House, also on the pike north of Franklin and a Williamson County historic resource

References

Central-passage houses in Tennessee
Greek Revival houses in Tennessee
Houses completed in 1845
Houses in Franklin, Tennessee
Houses on the National Register of Historic Places in Tennessee
National Register of Historic Places in Williamson County, Tennessee